Angelis Angeli (born 31 May 1989), also known as Angelis Charalambous, is a Cypriot professional footballer who plays as a centre back for Enosis Neon Paralimni and Cyprus national team.

Club career
Angeli had played most of his early career as a youth for Anorthosis Famagusta before the move to Scotland. He was signed by Motherwell in June 2010 after impressing the youth coaches when Motherwell's reserve team played a succession of friendlies in  Cyprus. Angeli signed a one-year contract with the option of a further year. He was on the bench for Motherwell's Europa League tie with Breiðablik, although he was an unused substitute in that match. He was released by Motherwell on 1 June 2011 having never played a first team match for the club.

International career
Charalambous has earned four caps for the Cyprus U21 football team, the first of which came against Slovakia in September 2009. He has been a regular starter for the under-21 side ever since.

Personal life
Charalambous was a tank commander in the army prior to his move to Scotland.

References

External links

 

1989 births
Living people
Cypriot footballers
Cypriot expatriate footballers
Expatriate footballers in Scotland
Cyprus international footballers
People from Larnaca
Association football defenders
Anorthosis Famagusta F.C. players
Motherwell F.C. players
Ermis Aradippou FC players
Apollon Limassol FC players
Enosis Neon Paralimni FC players